Under the Running Board is an EP by American mathcore band the Dillinger Escape Plan, released on October 22, 1998.  The album shows a more experimental side, which would later be more developed on Calculating Infinity. This is also the band's first release on Relapse Records. The song "Abe the Cop" would later be performed and recorded on their self-titled EP's re-release in 2000.

Reissue
Almost 10 years to the day of its original release, Under the Running Board was re-released by Relapse Records. The reissue contains the original three tracks plus 10 bonus tracks.

Track listing

Personnel
Adam Doll – bass
Dimitri Minakakis – vocals
Chris Pennie – drums
Ben Weinman – lead guitar, vocals
John Fulton – rhythm guitar
Liam Wilson - bass (reissue bonus tracks)
Brian Benoit - rhythm guitar (reissue bonus tracks 4-12)

Additional personnel
Alan Douches – mastering
Steve Evetts – producer, engineer
Adam Peterson – graphic design

References

The Dillinger Escape Plan albums
1999 EPs
2008 live albums
Relapse Records live albums
Relapse Records EPs
Albums produced by Steve Evetts